Bukovets pass — pass in Pokuttya-Bucovina Carpathians. It is located in the Verkhovyna Raion of the Ivano-Frankivsk Oblast, in the  Bukovec village, on the Drainage divide of the Rybnytsia and Chornyi Cheremosh rivers. Elevation 835 m. Through the pass goes the local highway Р 24: Kosiv — Verkhovyna.

From the pass begins the touristic footpath to the local nature landmark Pysanyj Kamin (Painted Rock).

Closest villages are Bukovets, Cheretiv, Kryvorivnia.

References

External links 
 Encyclopedia of Ukraine
 Trip to Pysanyj Kamin (in Ukrainian)
 Bike trip to Bukovets pass (in Ukrainian)

Mountain passes of Ukraine
Mountain passes of the Carpathians